Elections to the United States House of Representatives were held in Pennsylvania on October 11, 1808, for the 11th Congress.

Background
Eighteen Representatives had been elected in the previous election, 15 Democratic-Republicans and 3 Federalists.  All three Federalists and two of the Democratic-Republicans were quids, an alliance of moderate Democratic-Republicans and Federalists.  One seat held by a Democratic-Republican had become vacant prior to this election and was filled in a special election held at the same time as this election.

Congressional districts
Pennsylvania was divided into 11 districts, of which four were plural districts with 11 Representatives between them, with the remaining 7 Representatives elected from single-member districts.  The districts were:
The  (3 seats) consisted of Delaware and Philadelphia counties (including the City of Philadelphia)
The  (3 seats) consisted of Bucks, Luzerne, Montgomery, Northampton, and Wayne Counties
The  (3 seats) consisted of Berks, Chester, and Lancaster Counties
The  (2 seats) consisted of Cumberland, Dauphin, Huntingdon, and Mifflin Counties
The  consisted of Centre, Clearfield, Lycoming, McKean, Northumberland, Potter, and Tioga Counties
The  consisted of Adams and York Counties
The  consisted of Bedford and Franklin Counties
The  consisted of Armstrong, Cambria, Indiana, Jefferson, Somerset, and Westmoreland Counties
The  consisted of Fayette and Greene Counties
The  consisted of Washington County
The  consisted of Allegheny, Beaver, Butler, Crawford, Erie, Mercer, Venango, and Warren Counties

Luzerne County's western border was altered between the 1806 and 1808 elections, altering the boundary between the 2nd and 5th districts

Note: Many of these counties covered much larger areas than they do today, having since been divided into smaller counties

Election results
Thirteen incumbents (10 Democratic-Republicans and 3 Federalists) ran for re-election, of whom 11 won re-election. There was also a vacancy in the 1st district. One seat changed from Federalist to Democratic-Republican control.

Special election
Benjamin Say (DR) of the  resigned in June, 1809, and a special election was held to fill the resulting vacancy

References
Electoral data and information on districts are from the Wilkes University Elections Statistics Project

1808
Pennsylvania
United States House of Representatives